Legacy is an album by pianist Ronnie Mathews which was recorded in 1978 and released on the Bee Hive label.

Reception

The AllMusic review by Scott Yanow stated, "Pianist Ronnie Mathews assembled an all-star group for this hard bop set. Mathews had long been a distinctive but underrated player and is heard in prime form on a varied program ... The musicians all live up to their potential".

Track listing

Personnel
Ronnie Mathews – piano
Bill Hardman – trumpet (tracks 1, 3-5 & 7)
Ricky Ford – tenor saxophone (tracks 1, 3-5 & 7)
Walter Booker – bass (tracks 1 & 3-7)
Jimmy Cobb – drums (tracks 1 & 3-7)

References

Ronnie Mathews albums
1980 albums
Bee Hive Records albums